A Lesson to Be earned is the debut album by the RBL Posse. It was released on September 16, 1992, for In-a-Minute Records and was produced by Black C, DJ Switch and TC. A Lesson to Be Learned gained mild success, peaking at #60 on the Top R&B/Hip-Hop Albums and producing the hit single, "Don t Give Me No Bammer", which peaked at #16 on the Hot Rap Singles.

Track listing
"Intro"- 2:19  
"I Ain't No Joke"- 4:00  
"More Like an Orgy"- 3:57  
"Don't Give Me No Bammer Weed"- 5:29  
"Bitches on the Ding Dong"- 4:23  
"A Lesson to Be Learned"- 4:04  
"G's by the 1, 2, 3's"- 5:56 (Featuring Totally Insane) 
"Remind Me"- 5:52  
"Sorta Like a Psycho"- 4:23  
"A Part of a Survival"- 4:58  
"Outro"- 2:39

Samples:

"I Ain't No Joke" samples "Soft & Wet" by Prince, "I Ain't No Joke" by Eric B. & Rakim, & "Bring It Here" by Wild Sugar.

"More Like an Orgy" samples "The Big Bang Theory" by Parliament, "The Humpty Dance" by Digital Underground & "Gangsta Gangsta" by N.W.A.

"Don't Give Me No Bammer Weed" samples "Intro Theme" by Marvin Gaye.

"Bitches On The Ding Dong" samples "Cholly (Funk Getting Ready To Roll!) by Funkadelic & "Get Off My Dick & Tell Yo Bitch To Come Here [Remix]" by Ice Cube.

"A Lesson To Be Learned" samples "Rapper's Delight" by Sugar Hill Gang & "Good Times" by Chic.

"G's by the 1, 2, 3's" samples "Fly Like an Eagle" by Steve Miller Band & "It's Funky Enough" by The D.O.C.

"Remind Me" samples "Remind Me" by Patrice Rushen.

"Sorta Like a Psycho" samples "Fire" by The Ohio Players.

"A Part of a Survival" samples "Get It Up" by The Time & "Funkentelechy" by Parliament.

"Outro" samples "Groove With You" by The Isley Brothers.

1992 debut albums
RBL Posse albums